The Surface Web (also called the Visible Web, Indexed Web, Indexable Web or Lightnet) is the portion of the World Wide Web that is readily available to the general public and searchable with standard web search engines. It is the opposite of the deep web, the part of the web not indexed by a web search engine. The Surface Web only consists of 10 percent of the information that is on the internet. The Surface Web is made with a collection of public Web pages on a server accessible by any search engine.

According to one source, Google's Index of the Surface Web Contains about 14.8 billion pages.

See also
 Clearnet (networking)

References

Internet search engines
Internet terminology
Dark web